The Cacaina (also: Șorogari) is a left tributary of the river Bahlui in eastern Romania. It flows into the Bahlui in the city Iași. The Vânători and Cârlig dams are located on the river.

References

Rivers of Romania
Rivers of Iași County